The  is a railway line in Japan owned by the private railway company Shin-Keisei Electric Railway, a subsidiary of Keisei Electric Railway. The line runs between Matsudo Station in Matsudo, Chiba, and Keisei-Tsudanuma Station in Narashino, Chiba.

Operations 
All trains stop at all stations. Most trains operate throughout the line, although during the morning hours, some services terminate at Shin-Tsudanuma. In mornings and nights some trains originate or terminate at Kunugiyama.

Services operate at a frequency of one train every 4 minutes in the morning peak, every 10 minutes during the day, and every 8 minutes in the evening peak.

Stations
 All trains stop at all stations.

Rolling stock 
 Shin-Keisei 8800 series (since 1986)
 Shin-Keisei 8900 series (since 1993)
 Shin-Keisei N800 series (since May 2005)
 Shin-Keisei 80000 series (since December 2019)

All trains are based at Kunugiyama and Tsudanuma Depots.

Former 
 Keisei 33/39/45 series
 Keisei 100/126 series
 Keisei 200/220/250/500/550/2300 series
 Keisei 300 series
 Keisei 600 series
 Keisei 700/2200 series
 Keisei 1100 series
 Keisei 1500 series
 Keisei 2100 series
 Shin-Keisei 800 series (from 1974 until 2010)
 Shin-Keisei 8000 series (from 1978 until 2021)

History

The Yukuendai - Takifudo section was reopened in 1948, and extended to Hatsutomi the following year.

References 

 
Railway lines in Japan
Railway lines in Chiba Prefecture
Standard gauge railways in Japan
Railway lines opened in 1947
1947 establishments in Japan